Çukurca can refer to:

 Çukurca
 Çukurca, Gerede
 Çukurca, Kızılcahamam
 Çukurca, Korkuteli
 Çukurca, Kulp
 Çukurca, Kurşunlu
 Çukurca, Mengen
 Çukurca, Sandıklı